Patkotak is a surname. Notable people with the surname include:

 Beverly Patkotak Grinage, American academic administrator and community organizer
 Josiah Patkotak (born 1994), American politician

Native American surnames